Prokopenko or Prakapienka is a Ukrainian, Belarusian, and Russian surname. It may refer to:

 Aleksandr Prokopenko (1953–1989), Soviet-Belarusian footballer
 Alena Prokopenko (born 1992), Russian judoka
 Anastasia Prokopenko (born 1986), Russian badminton player
 Anastasiya Prokopenko (born 1985), Belarusian pentathlete
 Andrii Prokopenko (born 1982), Ukrainian entrepreneur and politician
 Denis Prokopenko (born 1991), Kazakhstani footballer
 Denys Prokopenko (born 1991), Ukrainian military commander  
 Dmitri Prokopenko (born 1972), Russian footballer
 Gennady Prokopenko (born 1964), Soviet-Russian ski jumper
 Georgy Prokopenko (1937–2021), Soviet-Ukrainian swimmer
 Maksym Prokopenko (born 1984), Ukrainian-Azerbaijani canoer
 Pavel Prokopenko (born 1987), Russian pole vaulter
 Viktor Prokopenko (1944–2007), Soviet-Ukrainian footballer and coach
 Vladislav Prokopenko (born 2000), Kazakhstani footballer
 Yevhen Prokopenko (born 1988), Ukrainian footballer

See also
 

Belarusian-language surnames
Russian-language surnames
Ukrainian-language surnames
Patronymic surnames
Surnames from given names